7th World Soundtrack Awards
October 20, 2007

Best Original Soundtrack:
 The Fountain 
The 7th World Soundtrack Awards were given on 20 October 2007 in Ghent, Belgium.

Winners
Soundtrack Composer of the Year:
Alexandre Desplat for The Painted Veil and The Queen
Best Original Soundtrack of the Year:
The Fountain - Clint Mansell
Best Original Song Written for a Film:
"You Know My Name" from Casino Royale
performed by Chris Cornell
Public Choice Award:
The Fountain - Clint Mansell
Discovery of the Year:
Daniel Tarrab and Andres Goldstein - XXY, Inheritance
Lifetime Achievement Award:
Mikis Theodorakis

0
2007 film awards
2007 music awards